The 1944–45 season saw Rochdale compete for their 6th season in the wartime league (League North). The season was split into 2 championships. Rochdale finished in 27th position in the first and in 57th position and in the second. Some matches in the 2nd Championship were also in the League War Cup and Lancashire Cup.

Statistics
												

|}

Competitions

Football League North & War League Cup

References

Rochdale A.F.C. seasons
Rochdale